Sibinia subelliptica is a species of acorn and nut weevils belonging to the family Curculionidae, subfamily Curculioninae.

This beetle is present in most of Europe, in the eastern Palearctic realm, in the Near East, and in North Africa.

Larvae feed on seeds, while pupation occurs into the soil. The colour of this small insect is brown, with longitudinal grooves on elytra.

References 

 Roberto Caldara - Note tassonomiche e nomenclatoriali su alcune specie paleartiche di Sibinia e Tychius (Coleoptera, Curculionidae) - Fragmenta entomologica, Roma, 41 (1): 169-195 (2009)
 Alziar, G. 1977. Queques observations sur la biologie de Sibinia subelliptica Desbr. (Coleoptera, Curculionidae). Riviera Scientifique, 9 (1976): 2.

External links 
 Biolib
 Fauna Europaea
 Coleoptera Poloniae

Curculioninae
Beetles of Europe
Beetles described in 1873